Gabriel Odor (born 23 August 2000) is an Austrian speed skater who competed at the 2022 Winter Olympics.

Career
During the 2019 World Junior Speed Skating Championships, he became first Austrian male skater to win a World Junior Championship.

Odor represented Austria at the 2022 Winter Olympics in the mass start event.

References

2000 births
Living people
Austrian male speed skaters
People from Hall in Tirol
Olympic speed skaters of Austria
Speed skaters at the 2022 Winter Olympics
Sportspeople from Tyrol (state)